Aphanocalyx heitzii is a species of plant in the family Fabaceae. It is found in Gabon and possibly Cameroon. It is threatened by habitat loss.

References

Detarioideae
Flora of Gabon
Near threatened plants
Taxonomy articles created by Polbot
Taxobox binomials not recognized by IUCN